Kingscote Park is a municipal park extending over  in Layton, a suburb of Blackpool in the county of Lancashire, England. The park is the second largest park within Blackpool after Stanley Park and the largest park in Layton.

Background
Kingscote Park is bordered on the north by Grange Road, Nethway Avenue to the east, Bardsway Avenue and Blairway Avenue to the south and Kingscote Drive along the western side. The park has a large field to the North with trees along the west and south sides, with another field to the south-east which has trees along the south, east and western sides, a children's playground, tarmac sports area.

There is a disused building to the south west of the park. The friends of Kingcote Park are currently fundraising to demolish the existing building and build a new community centre.

See also
Bispham Rock Gardens
George Bancroft Park, Blackpool
Kincraig Lake Ecological Reserve
Moor Park, Blackpool
Salisbury Woodland Gardens, Blackpool
Stanley Park, Blackpool

References

External links
 Blackpool Borough Council website
 Layton and Kingscote Park Community Group

Parks and commons in Blackpool